The 1979–80 UEFA Cup was the ninth season of the UEFA Cup, a football competition organised by UEFA for clubs representing its member associations. The competitions was won by Eintracht Frankfurt, who beat Borussia Mönchengladbach on the away goals rule after a 3–3 aggregate draw in the final. All four semi-finalists came from West Germany, and a fifth was eliminated in the quarter-finals. This is the only time all four semi-finalists in a UEFA club competition came from a single nation.

The third club was revoked to Bulgaria and East Germany, and it was assigned to Czechoslovakia. The title holders obtained a place.

Bracket

First round

|}

First leg

Second leg

Zbrojovka Brno won 7–1 on aggregate.

AGF won 2–1 on aggregate.

Eintracht Frankfurt won 2–1 on aggregate.

Aris Thessaloniki won 4–3 on aggregate.

Dynamo Dresden won 5–1 on aggregate.

Borussia Mönchengladbach won 4–1 on aggregate.

Dinamo București won 12–0 on aggregate.

1–1 on aggregate; Dundee United won on away goals.

Bayern Munich won 4–2 on aggregate.

Carl Zeiss Jena won 4–1 on aggregate.

Dynamo Kyiv won 3–2 on aggregate.

Grasshoppers won 6–0 on aggregate.

Monaco won 3–2 on aggregate.

Feyenoord won 2–0 on aggregate.

Kaiserslautern won 8–2 on aggregate.

Red Star Belgrade won 3–1 on aggregate.

Standard Liège won 2–0 on aggregate.

Inter Milan won 3–2 on aggregate.

2–2 on aggregate; Keflavík won on away goals.

Malmö FF won 4–1 on aggregate.

Napoli won 2–1 on aggregate.

Baník Ostrava won 6–2 on aggregate.

Perugia won 1–0 on aggregate.

Lokomotiv Sofia won 3–2 on aggregate.

Diósgyőri VTK won 4–2 on aggregate.

Ipswich Town won 10–1 on aggregate.

Sporting CP won 2–0 on aggregate.

PSV Eindhoven won 1–0 on aggregate.

Leeds United won 7–0 on aggregate.

2–2 on aggregate; Stuttgart won on away goals.

Saint-Étienne won 4–2 on aggregate.

Universitatea Craiova won 3–1 on aggregate.

Second round

|}

First leg

Second leg

Zbrojovka Brno won 5–2 on aggregate.

Bayern Munich won 5–2 on aggregate.

Aris Thessaloniki won 4–1 on aggregate.

Borussia Mönchengladbach won 4–3 on aggregate.

Eintracht Frankfurt won 3–2 on aggregate.

Diósgyöri VTK won 4–1 on aggregate.

1–1 on aggregate; Stuttgart won on away goals.

Dynamo Kyiv won 2–1 on aggregate.

Universitatea Craiova won 4–0 on aggregate.

Feyenoord won 5–1 on aggregate.

1–1 on aggregate; Grasshoppers won on away goals.

Lokomotiv Sofia won 5–4 on aggregate.

Saint-Étienne won 6–2 on aggregate.

Red Star Belgrade won 6–4 on aggregate.

Kaiserslautern won 3–1 on aggregate.

Standard Liège won 3–2 on aggregate.

Third round

|}

First leg

Second leg

Saint-Étienne won 7–4 on aggregate.

Bayern Munich won 4–3 on aggregate.

Borussia Mönchengladbach won 2–1 on aggregate.

Kaiserslautern won 8–1 on aggregate.

Eintracht Frankfurt won 4–2 on aggregate.

Stuttgart won 5–0 on aggregate.

2–2 on aggregate; Lokomotiv Sofia won on away goals.

Zbrojovka Brno won 5–3 on aggregate.

Quarter-finals

|}

First leg

Second leg

Bayern Munich won 4–2 on aggregate.

Borussia Mönchengladbach won 6–1 on aggregate.

Eintracht Frankfurt won 6–4 on aggregate.

Stuttgart won 4–1 on aggregate.

Semi-finals

|}

First leg

Second leg

Eintracht Frankfurt won 5–3 on aggregate.

Borussia Mönchengladbach won 3–2 on aggregate.

Final

First leg

Second leg

3–3 on aggregate; Eintracht Frankfurt won on away goals.

Notes

References

External links
1979–80 All matches UEFA Cup – season at UEFA website
 All scorers 1979–80 UEFA Cup according to protocols UEFA
1979–80 UEFA Cup at Union of European Football Associations
1979–80 UEFA Cup at Rec.Sport.Soccer Statistics Foundation
1979/80 UEFA Cup - results and line-ups (archive)

UEFA Cup seasons
2